Erythranthe lutea is a species of monkeyflower also known as yellow monkeyflower, monkey musk, blotched monkey flowers, and blood-drop-emlets. It was formerly known as Mimulus luteus.

Description
The flowers are yellow with irregular reg blotches and the leaves are hairy, paired, and round. Because of its yellow petals, E. luteus is in the "yellow monkeyflower" group, unlike most members of the genus, which have red or pink petals.

Some sources list Erythranthe lutea separately due to chromosomal variations. Barker, etal (2012) proposes a new taxonomy for Phrymaceae, leaving only 7 species in Mimulus, none in Mimulus lutea, and placing 111 in Erythranthe. Barker also offers 4 different options for how to implement this new taxonomy.

The luteus group consists of Erythranthe luteus var. variegatus, E. naiandinus and E. cupreus.

Distribution and habitat
Erythranthe lutea prefers to grow in wet habitats such as marshes and riverbanks. It grows in North and South America and has been naturalized in Britain, having been first cultivated there circa 1826.

References

Further reading
 plate 1030: Mimulus luteus; var. rivularis Crimsoned Mimulus; the Lowland variety

External links

lutea
Flora of the United States